Sir David James Gardiner Rose  (10 April 1923 – 10 November 1969) was Governor-General of Guyana from 1966 to 1969.

Biography

Rose was born in Mahaica in British Guiana on 10 April 1923, and was educated at Mount St Mary's College in England. Returning to British Guiana in 1948, following World War II, the newly wed Rose joined the colonial police force and later became Assistant Commissioner of Police (Crime). In 1960-61 he was appointed as defence officer to the Federal Government of the West Indies Federation in Trinidad. Following the breakup of the Federation, between 1964 and 1966, he was the Administrator of Antigua. He was then transferred to a newly independent Guyana, where he served as Governor General from 1966 to 1969.

He was killed in an accident while visiting London to relinquish his post. He had been luncheoning at the West Indian Club, Whitehall Court, when some scaffolding collapsed upon a car in which he found himself.

The honours he received included the Colonial Police Medal with bar for gallantry, and the highest award of Guyana, the Order of Excellence, which was awarded posthumously in 1970.

He was the first to be buried at the Place of Heroes inside the Botanical Gardens in Georgetown, Guyana.

References

1923 births
1969 deaths
Guyanese knights
Governors-General of Guyana
Recipients of the Order of Excellence of Guyana
Knights Grand Cross of the Order of St Michael and St George
Commanders of the Royal Victorian Order
Members of the Order of the British Empire
Recipients of the Colonial Police Medal
People from Demerara-Mahaica
British Guiana people
Governors of Antigua and Barbuda
Guyanese police officers
Burials in Guyana
People educated at Mount St Mary's College